The Boston Lobsters were a World TeamTennis team based in Boston, Massachusetts. The Boston Lobsters played home matches at the Walter Brown Arena, Boston University, in Boston, MA.

The most recent Boston Lobsters were a reincarnation of two previous WTT teams. The original Lobsters were a charter member of the league in 1974, and folded after just one season. The second Lobsters team were also a charter member of WTT in 1974, founded as the Philadelphia Freedoms. After the original Lobsters folded, businessman Robert Kraft purchased the Freedoms and moved them to Boston, renaming them the Lobsters. The second Lobsters team played in Boston for four seasons (1975–1978) before folding at the end of the 1978 season. WTT suspended operations shortly thereafter.

In 2005, local Boston businessman Bahar Uttam relaunched the team. The Lobsters made the Mylan WTT league's playoffs four times. In 2015, Uttam retired from the ownership position and the league took over operations of the Lobsters while seeking new local ownership. On February 17, 2016, WTT announced that the Lobsters would cease operations and were subsequently replaced with a new franchise called the New York Empire.

2015 squad

 Jan-Michael Gambill, Head Coach
 Eugenie Bouchard
 Chase Buchanan
 Irina Falconi
 Scott Lipsky
 Arantxa Parra Santonja

See also

 World TeamTennis
 Boston Lobsters (1974)
 Boston Lobsters (1974–1978)

References

External links
 Official Team Website
 Tennisopolis Profile Page
 Boston Lobsters on facebook
 Boston Lobsters on Twitter
 Boston Lobsters Youtube Channel

2005 establishments in Massachusetts
2016 disestablishments in Massachusetts
Defunct sports teams in Massachusetts
Defunct World TeamTennis teams
Manchester-by-the-Sea, Massachusetts
Sports clubs established in 2005
Sports clubs disestablished in 2016
Tennis in Massachusetts